Damir Špica (born 11 November 1962, in Banja Luka) is a former Yugoslav association footballer.

Club career
Špica played for Borac Banja Luka in the Yugoslav First League. While playing for this club, in 1988, he won Yugoslav Cup.

References

External links 
intervju
Greece 1991/92

1962 births
Living people
Yugoslav footballers
Yugoslav expatriate footballers
Expatriate footballers in Greece
Sportspeople from Banja Luka
Serbia and Montenegro expatriate footballers
Serbia and Montenegro footballers
Yugoslav expatriate sportspeople in Greece
Serbia and Montenegro expatriate sportspeople in Greece
Yugoslav First League players
FK Borac Banja Luka players
Athinaikos F.C. players
A.O. Kerkyra players
Association football midfielders